Edward Phelps (January 5, 1861 – May 12, 1931), son of Edward J. Phelps, was a seven-term mayor of Laurel, Maryland, from 1895 to 1902.

He brought to Laurel "electric lights, water works, improved streets, brick pavements, [an] electric railroad between Laurel and Washington, improved train service, free express delivery, telephone exchange system, three steel bridges over the Patuxent River and [a] night robe factory". As of 1908, the night robe factory was run by E. Rosenfeld & Co.

Life and family
Phelps was born in Laurel on January 5, 1861. He married Sevilla Sewall, and they had eleven children, two of whom died in infancy – Mable and Robert.  His four surviving daughters were Eva Dean (married George Dean), Edna Phelps, Maude Beall (married Norris Beall), and Lillian Phelps, and his five surviving sons were Harry S., Arthur P., Charles E., Alan, and William.  After Sewall died, Phelps married Helen Shaughnessy of Bryn Mawr, Pennsylvania.  They had no children.

Phelps died in Annapolis on May 12, 1931.

The Phelps & Shaffer Co.
Phelps formed a partnership with Charles F. Shaffer, Jr., and together they founded The Phelps & Shaffer Co. The store sold everything from clothespins to pianos. At 9th and Montgomery Streets, its building later housed the Laurel Volunteer Fire Department, Laurel City Hall and Police Department, and currently the Harrison-Beard Community Center.

Laurel High School
Phelps was instrumental in the 1899 founding of Laurel High School, the first high school in Prince George's County. When the project's low bidder failed to give bond and didn't continue with the contract, Phelps assumed the risk for completion of the work at that price (ultimately losing $1000 of his own money).

Phelps Mansion
Phelps built the house at 1110 Montgomery Street in 1888, and his family lived there until March 4, 1915.

References

1861 births
1931 deaths
Mayors of Laurel, Maryland